La Balme-d'Épy is a former commune in the Jura department in the region of Bourgogne-Franche-Comté in eastern France. On 1 January 2018, it was merged into the commune of Val-d'Épy.

Population

See also
Communes of the Jura department

References

Former communes of Jura (department)